This is a list of seasons completed by the Chicago White Sox, originally known as the Chicago White Stockings, professional baseball franchise. They have played in the American League from their inception in 1901.

The White Sox in total have completed 121 seasons in Major League Baseball, qualifying for the postseason eleven times and reaching the World Series five times (1906, 1917, 1919, 1959, 2005) with three world championships (1906, 1917, 2005). The White Sox began the first two decades of their inception with relative consistency among the eight teams in the League. In their first season, led by Calvin Griffith, they won the first American League pennant in 1901 with an 83-53-1 record. Pennant winners did not formally meet for the World Series until 1903, but the White Sox reached their first one in 1906 with a 93-58-3 record while managed by Fielder Jones. They won the cross-town series against the Chicago Cubs in six games. The team was relatively mediocre for the next couple of years before returning to form with the talents of players such as Eddie Cicotte and they won 100 games in 1917 for the first time in franchise history while roaring to the pennant. They won the Series in six games. An off year in 1918 set the stage for a riveting 1919 under rookie manager Kid Gleason that would develop into controversy. They won 88 games to win their second pennant in three years, but a number of disgruntled players would associate with gamblers before the Series in order to lose games for money. The White Sox lost five games to three and later saw the banishment of eight of their players (most notably Cicotte and Shoeless Joe Jackson) occur during the end of the 1920 season, which saw them miss the pennant by two games. They would not finish as close as two games out for the next three decades. By the middle of the 1950s, the White Sox were finally building talent to contend for a pennant, most notably with players such as Minnie Minoso, Nellie Fox and Billy Pierce. In 1955, they fell short by five games. Al Lopez was hired in 1957, and he would lead them to the pennant in 1959 with 94 victories. They faced the Los Angeles Dodgers in the Series and lost in six games. Although Lopez would never have a losing record in his tenure with the White Sox, they never did win another pennant with him as manager, with his final resignation occurring in 1969. For the next 35 years, the White Sox would go through periods of highs and lows that included two division titles under different managers (Tony La Russa in 1983 and Gene Lamont in 1993) while cultivating select stars from either the draft such as Frank Thomas and Harold Baines or trades for players like Carlton Fisk. However, it was not until 2005 that the White Sox put together a team that would compete fully for the AL pennant, with Ozzie Guillen leading the White Sox to 99 wins in the regular season on the heels of pitchers such as Mark Buehrle; that year, the White Sox won eleven of twelve postseason games to win their first world championship in 88 years. As of 2023, however, it also ranks as their last postseason series victory. The 2020 and 2021 seasons saw the White Sox reach the postseason both times, the first time in club history that they had made the postseason in consecutive seasons.

Year by year

Record by decade 
The following table describes the White Sox's MLB win–loss record by decade.

These statistics are from Baseball-Reference.com's Chicago White Sox History & Encyclopedia, except where noted, and are current as of November 2022.

Post-season record by year
The White Sox have made the postseason eleven times in their history, with their first being in 1906 and the most recent being in 2021.

References

External links
 White Sox Year-By-Year Results at MLB.com
 White Sox Postseason Results at MLB.com

 
Chicago White Sox
Seasons
Events in Chicago